Grabówka  (Hrabivka) is a village in the administrative district of Gmina Dydnia, within Brzozów County, Subcarpathian Voivodeship, in south-eastern Poland. There are approximately 450 people living in Grabowka.

References

Villages in Brzozów County